The 16th Saturn Awards, honoring the best in science fiction, fantasy and horror film and television in 1988, were held on January 21, 1990.

Winners and nominees 
Below is a complete list of nominees and winners. Winners are highlighted in bold.

Film

Television

Special awards

Life Career Award 
 Ray Walston

President's Award 
 Carrie Fisher

References

External links
Official Website

Saturn Awards ceremonies
1990 film awards
1990 television awards